"Stephanie Says" is a song by American band the Velvet Underground, originally recorded in 1968. Although available on various bootlegs, the song was not released officially until 1985 when a remixed version appeared on the album VU, and subsequently on the 1995 box set Peel Slowly and See. The original 1968 mix of "Stephanie Says" was included on the 2005 Velvet Underground compilation album Gold. 

Lou Reed rewrote the lyrics and renamed it "Caroline Says (II)" for his 1973 solo album Berlin. While vastly different in tone, it retained the refrain "It's so cold in Alaska".

Cover versions
 Lee Ranaldo of Sonic Youth covered the song on Fifteen Minutes: A Tribute to the Velvet Underground.
 Keren Ann and Barði Jóhannson, lead singer of Icelandic band Bang Gang covered the song on their album Lady and Bird.
 Serbian rock band Eva Braun covered the song with lyrics in the Serbian language in 1993 for the various artist compilation Radio Utopia. The song was released again as a bonus track on the remastered edition of their second studio album Pop Music.
 Icelandic singer Emiliana Torrini covered the song for her 1996 studio album Merman. Her version of the song reached number one on Iceland's Íslenski Listinn Topp 40 chart in January 1997 and ended the year at number 62 on the year-end chart.
 Bettie Serveert covered the song on their live cover album Plays Venus in Furs and Other Velvet Underground Songs.
 Taxi Girl covered the song for the Velvet Underground tribute album Les Enfants du Velvet in 1985 under the title "Je rêve encore de toi". This version was in turn covered by Stereo_Total in 2001.
 Paul Banks made a cover of this song on the BBC 6 Music (radio).
 Indie pop band The Pumpkin Fairies, whose members would later form Slowdive, recorded a cover of this song on their 1989 first demo tape.
 Brenda Kahn covered the song on her 2012 album “Seven Laws of Gravity.”
 The Soft Boys covered "Caroline Says" in their live/rarity compilation 1976-81 (released in 1993)

Related media
 In 2001, the song was used in the Wes Anderson film The Royal Tenenbaums.
 The song is referenced heavily in Amanda Palmer's "Blake Says" on her 2008 solo album Who Killed Amanda Palmer.
 The titular character's name in the John Green novel Looking for Alaska was inspired by the song, particularly the line "But she's not afraid to die, the people all call her Alaska".

References
 

Number-one singles in Iceland
Songs written by Lou Reed
The Velvet Underground songs